John Ellsworth Wroblewski (born May 26, 1981) is an American former ice hockey player. He is currently the head coach of the United States women's national ice hockey team. He is the former head coach of the USA Hockey National Team Development Program and Ontario Reign of the American Hockey League.

Coaching career
On August 3, 2011, the Gwinnett Gladiators announced that Wroblewski, the former assistant coach for the Wheeling Nailers, had been selected to take over from Jeff Pyle as the team's head coach. After two successful seasons in Gwinnett, Wroblewski joined the Rochester Americans of the American Hockey League (AHL) as an assistant coach. After another two seasons, he was fired as part of a coaching overhaul by the Amerks' owners, the Buffalo Sabres. 

On August 17, 2020, the Los Angeles Kings named Wroblewski the new head coach of the AHL's Ontario Reign. On May 31, 2022, Wroblewski was named the head coach of the United States women's national ice hockey team for the 2022 IIHF Women's World Championship.

References

External links

1981 births
Living people
Sportspeople from Neenah, Wisconsin
American ice hockey coaches
Fresno Falcons players
Atlanta Gladiators
Notre Dame Fighting Irish men's ice hockey players
USA Hockey National Team Development Program players
American men's ice hockey right wingers